Emmanuel Marie Joseph Antony "Maan" Sassen (11 September 1911 – 20 December 1995) was a Dutch politician, who served as European Commissioner for Competition in the Rey Commission from 1967 to 1971.

Career
Sassen studied law and earned a doctorate. From 1936 to 1950 he worked as a lawyer and district attorney. In 1939 he became a member of the States of North Brabant. In 1946 he was elected to the Dutch House of Representatives for the Katholieke Volkspartij (KVP). He served as Minister responsible for the Dutch Colonies (1948–1949) and as European Commissioner for Competition in the Rey Commission from 1967 to 1971.

He was a member of the Common Assembly of the European Coal and Steel Community from its establishment in 1952 and was the first President of the Christian Democratic group, the predecessor of the European People's Party Group.

References

1911 births
1995 deaths
Permanent Representatives of the Netherlands to the European Union
Dutch European Commissioners
Dutch Roman Catholics
European Commissioners for Competition
Ministers of Colonial Affairs of the Netherlands
People from 's-Hertogenbosch
Politicians of Catholic political parties
Catholic People's Party MEPs
MEPs for the Netherlands 1958–1979
European Commissioners 1967–1970